Pawapuri or Pavapuri (also called Apapapuri, meaning "the sinless town") is a holy site for Jains located in the Nalanda district of Bihar state in Eastern India. It is located about 19 kilometers from Rajgir and 101 kilometers from Patna, the capital of Bihar. Pawapuri is the place of Mahavira's nirvana and a pilgrimage site for Jains.

See also
 Jal Mandir
Nalanda

Pawapuri Tour And Travel

References

Citations

Sources
 

Cities and towns in Nalanda district
Jain pilgrimage sites
Tourist attractions in Nalanda district
Jain temples in Bihar